Several distinguished leaders have addressed a joint session of Dáil Éireann and Seanad Éireann, the two houses of the Oireachtas or parliament of Ireland. The President of Ireland is entitled to make such an address under Article 13.7.1° of the Constitution. Tim Healy, the first Governor-General of the Irish Free State, made addresses in 1922 and 1923 modelled on the British speech from the throne. Several foreign leaders have been honoured with an invitation to address the Oireachtas, typically during a state visit. The Official Report of Dáil and Seanad proceedings takes special care when recording such events and the transcript of speeches may be supplemented with description of ancillary actions. A few leaders have also addressed Dáil Éireann sitting alone; those are also listed below. The standing orders of Seanad Éireann more readily allow addresses by non-members: see the list of addresses to Seanad Éireann.

On 28 April 1949, Jawaharlal Nehru, the Prime Minister of India, was received on the floor of the Dáil; he did not make a speech.

On 21 January 2019, a programme of events in the Mansion House, to mark the centenary of the First Dáil, included an address by President Michael D. Higgins and a joint sitting of the 32nd Dáil and 25th Seanad; however, the address was not formally part of the joint sitting.

On 18 April 2019, Nancy Pelosi, the Speaker of the United States House of Representatives, addressed current and former members of the Oireachtas, but not at a formal sitting of the Dáil or Seanad.

See also
 List of addresses to Seanad Éireann; such addresses are a more regular part of the Seanad's ordinary business.

References

Addresses
Oireachtas
Addresses to the Oireachtas
Oireachtas